Sabine Skvara (born 15 April 1966) is a retired Austrian high jumper.

She finished seventh at the 1985 European Indoor Championships. She became Austrian champion in 1981 and 1985.

External links 
 Profile at the ÖLV

References

1966 births
Living people
Austrian female high jumpers